Tribromide is the anion with the chemical formula Br3−, or salts containing it:

 Tetrabutylammonium tribromide
 Tetrabromophosphonium tribromide
 Pyridinium perbromide

Sodium and potassium tribromides can be prepared by reacting NaBr or KBr with aqueous bromine.

 Br− + Br2 → Br3−

Tribromide may also refer to binary chemical compounds containing three bromine atoms:

 Aluminium tribromide, AlBr3
 Antimony tribromide, SbBr3
 Arsenic tribromide, AsBr3
 Bismuth tribromide, BiBr3
 Boron tribromide, BBr3
 Chromium tribromide, CrBr3
 Erbium tribromide, ErBr3
 Europium tribromide, EuBr3
 Ferric tribromide, FeBr3
 Gallium tribromide, GaBr3
 Gold tribromide, AuBr3 or Au2Br6
 Indium tribromide, InBr3
 Molybdenum tribromide, MoBr3
 Nitrogen tribromide, NBr3
 Phosphorus tribromide, PBr3
 Samarium tribromide, SmBr3
 Terbium tribromide, TbBr3
 Vanadium tribromide, VBr3
 Ytterbium tribromide, YbBr3
 Yttrium tribromide, YBr3

Bromine compounds